The 1923 Major League Baseball season was contested from April 17 to October 15, 1923. The New York Giants and New York Yankees were the regular season champions of the National League and American League, respectively. The Yankees then defeated the Giants in the World Series, four games to two.

This was the second of eight seasons that "League Awards", a precursor to the Major League Baseball Most Valuable Player Award (introduced in 1931), were issued. Only an American League award was given in 1923.

Awards and honors
League Award
Babe Ruth, New York Yankees, OF

Standings

American League

National League

Postseason

Bracket

Statistical leaders

Managers

American League

National League

Home Field Attendance

References

External links
1923 Major League Baseball season schedule at Baseball Reference

 
Major League Baseball seasons